Morga is a municipality located in the province of Biscay, in the autonomous community of Basque Country, northern Spain.

References

External links

 MORGA in the Bernardo Estornés Lasa - Auñamendi Encyclopedia (Euskomedia Fundazioa) (in basque)

Topographic (with contour lines) big scale maps, from the Bizkaiko Foru Aldundia Website (Territorial Government)
North Western side
North Eastern side
South Western side
South Eastern side

Municipalities in Biscay